ITU-T Recommendation X.1035 specifies a password-authenticated key agreement protocol that ensures mutual authentication of two parties by using a Diffie–Hellman key exchange to establish a symmetric cryptographic key. The use of Diffie-Hellman exchange ensures perfect forward secrecy—a property of a key establishment protocol that guarantees that compromise of a session key or long-term private key after a given session does not cause the compromise of any earlier session.

In X.1035, the exchange is protected from the man-in-the-middle attack. The authentication relies on a pre-shared secret (e.g., password), which is protected (i.e., remains unrevealed) to an eavesdropper preventing an off-line dictionary attack.

The protocol can be used in a wide variety of applications including those with pre-shared secrets based on possibly weak passwords.

X.1035 was approved on 13 February 2007 by ITU-T Study Group 17.

Applications
G.hn, an ITU-T standard that specifies high-speed (up to 1 Gbit/s) local area networking over existing home wires (power lines, phone lines and coaxial cables), uses X.1035 for authentication and key exchange.

References

Cryptographic protocols
Secure communication
Applications of cryptography
Open standards
International standards
Computer networks
Internet Standards
ITU-T recommendations
ITU-T X Series Recommendations